Lasianthus is a genus of flowering plants in the family Rubiaceae. They are tropical subshrubs, shrubs, or rarely, small trees. They inhabit the understory of primary forests.

Lasianthus has about 180 species. The type species for the genus is Lasianthus cyanocarpus.  In 2012, a revision of Lasianthus in Malesia described 131 species. Another 30 or so species grow elsewhere in tropical Asia. Most of these are described in Flora of China or in A Revised Handbook to the Flora of Ceylon. Fifteen species or perhaps as many as 20 species are known from tropical Africa. Two species (Lasianthus panamensis and Lasianthus lanceolatus), or possibly three, are native to the neotropics. Lasianthus strigosus, from Queensland, is the only species known from Australia. The Australian Ixora baileyana had at one time been placed in Lasianthus as Lasianthus graciliflorus.

Dried specimens of Lasianthus often shed their flowers and fruit. For this reason, misidentification is common, even in herbaria.

The name Lasianthus has been misapplied to Lisianthius (also spelled as "Lisianthus" or "Lisyanthus"), a genus in Gentianaceae. Lasianthus alatus Aublet is a misspelling of Lisyanthus alatus Aublet, a species now placed in Chelonanthus.

Species 
, Plants of the World Online accepted the following species:

Lasianthus acuminatissimus Merr.
Lasianthus acuminatus Wight
Lasianthus acutatus Miq.
Lasianthus africanus Hiern
Lasianthus agasthyamalayanus R.Jagad., S.P.Mathew, Gangapr. & E.S.S.Kumar
Lasianthus angustifolius King & Gamble
Lasianthus annamicus Pit.
Lasianthus apiocarpus Miq.
Lasianthus appressus Hook.f.
Lasianthus aristatus Craib
Lasianthus atroneurus H.Zhu
Lasianthus attenuatus Jack
Lasianthus austrosinensis H.S.Lo
Lasianthus austroyunnanensis H.Zhu
Lasianthus baasianus H.Zhu
Lasianthus bahorucanus Zanoni
Lasianthus barbatus H.Zhu
Lasianthus barbiger Ridl.
Lasianthus batangensis K.Schum.
Lasianthus bicolor Craib
Lasianthus bidoupensis V.S.Dang & Naiki
Lasianthus biermannii King ex Hook.f.
Lasianthus bifloroideus H.Zhu
Lasianthus biflorus (Blume) M.Gangop. & Chakrab.
Lasianthus blumeanus Wight
Lasianthus bokorensis Naiki
Lasianthus borneensis Merr.
Lasianthus bracteolatus Miq.
Lasianthus brevipedicellatus H.Zhu
Lasianthus brevipedunculatus H.Zhu
Lasianthus brochidodromus H.Zhu
Lasianthus bruneensis H.Zhu
Lasianthus burmanicus M.Gangop. & Chakrab.
Lasianthus caeruleus Pit.
Lasianthus cailinianus H.Zhu
Lasianthus calycinus Dunn
Lasianthus cambodianus Pit.
Lasianthus capitatus Blume
Lasianthus capitulatus Wight
Lasianthus cereiflorus E.A.Bruce
Lasianthus chartaceus Craib
Lasianthus chevalieri Pit.
Lasianthus chinensis (Champ.) Benth.
Lasianthus chlorocarpus K.Schum.
Lasianthus chowdheryi Karthig., Jayanthi & Sumathi
Lasianthus chryseus Ridl.
Lasianthus chrysocaulis Ridsdale
Lasianthus chrysoneurus (Korth.) Miq.
Lasianthus chrysophyllus Miq.
Lasianthus chrysotrichus Lauterb.
Lasianthus chunii H.S.Lo
Lasianthus ciliatus Wight
Lasianthus cinereus Gamble
Lasianthus clementis Merr.
Lasianthus coffeoides Fyson
Lasianthus congesticymus H.Zhu
Lasianthus conspicuus Ridl.
Lasianthus constrictus Wight
Lasianthus cordatus Merr.
Lasianthus coriaceifolius H.Zhu
Lasianthus coronatus King & Gamble
Lasianthus crassinervis Ridl.
Lasianthus crinitus Hook.f.
Lasianthus curtisii King & Gamble
Lasianthus cyanocarpoides Valeton
Lasianthus cyanocarpus Jack
Lasianthus dalatensis Wernham
Lasianthus depressineurus H.Zhu
Lasianthus dichotomus Wight
Lasianthus dinghouanus H.Zhu
Lasianthus eberhardtii Pit.
Lasianthus elevatineurus H.Zhu
Lasianthus ellipsoideus H.Zhu
Lasianthus ellipticus Wight
Lasianthus eriocalyx H.Zhu
Lasianthus euneurus Stapf
Lasianthus fansipanensis V.S.Dang & Naiki
Lasianthus fasciculus H.Zhu
Lasianthus ferrugineus King & Gamble
Lasianthus filiformis King & Gamble
Lasianthus filipedunculatus H.Zhu
Lasianthus filipes Chun ex H.S.Lo
Lasianthus flavihirtus H.Zhu
Lasianthus flavinervius Ridl.
Lasianthus floresensis H.Zhu
Lasianthus foetidissimus A.Chev. ex Pit.
Lasianthus foetulentus Ridsdale
Lasianthus fordii Hance
Lasianthus formosensis Matsum.
Lasianthus foxworthyanus Craib
Lasianthus furcatoides H.Zhu
Lasianthus gardneri (Thwaites) Hook.f.
Lasianthus giganteus Naiki
Lasianthus glaber Ridl.
Lasianthus glomeruliflorus K.Schum.
Lasianthus griffithii Wight
Lasianthus halconensis Arshed & Alejandro
Lasianthus harmandianus Pierre ex Pit.
Lasianthus harveyanus King & Gamble
Lasianthus helferi Hook.f.
Lasianthus henryi Hutch.
Lasianthus hexander Blume
Lasianthus hirsutisepalus H.Zhu
Lasianthus hirsutus (Roxb.) Merr.
Lasianthus hirtimarginatus H.Zhu
Lasianthus hirtus Ridl.
Lasianthus hispidulus (Drake) Pit.
Lasianthus honbaensis V.S.Dang, Tagane & H.Toyama
Lasianthus hookeri C.B.Clarke ex Hook.f.
Lasianthus idukkianus E.S.S.Kumar & P.E.Roy
Lasianthus inodorus Blume
Lasianthus iteoides Valeton ex H.Zhu
Lasianthus iteophyllus Miq.
Lasianthus jackianus Wight
Lasianthus jangarunii Y.W.Low
Lasianthus japonicus Miq.
Lasianthus kailarsenii Poopath, S.Vajrodaya & Napiroon
Lasianthus kilimandscharicus K.Schum.
Lasianthus kinabaluensis Stapf
Lasianthus konchurangensis V.S.Dang, T.B.Tran & Ha
Lasianthus krabiensis Napiroon, Balslev & Chamch.
Lasianthus laevigatus Blume
Lasianthus lanceolatus (Griseb.) Urb.
Lasianthus lancifolius Hook.f.
Lasianthus lancilobus H.Zhu
Lasianthus larsenii H.Zhu
Lasianthus latifolius (Blume ex DC.) Miq.
Lasianthus laxifloroideus H.Zhu
Lasianthus laxiflorus Merr.
Lasianthus laxinervis (Verdc.) Jannerup
Lasianthus lecomtei Pit.
Lasianthus ledermannii Valeton
Lasianthus linearifolius H.Zhu
Lasianthus linearisepalus C.Y.Wu & H.Zhu
Lasianthus lineolatus Craib
Lasianthus loeiensis H.Zhu
Lasianthus longibracteatus H.Zhu
Lasianthus longifolius Wight
Lasianthus longipedunculatus R.Parker
Lasianthus longissimus H.Zhu
Lasianthus lucidus Blume
Lasianthus macrobracteatus Rugayah & Sunarti
Lasianthus macrocalyx K.Schum.
Lasianthus maculatus Craib
Lasianthus malaccensis King & Gamble
Lasianthus malaiensis H.Zhu
Lasianthus marginatus Craib
Lasianthus meeboldii Deb & M.G.Gangop.
Lasianthus megaphyllus H.Zhu
Lasianthus membranaceoideus H.Zhu
Lasianthus membranaceus Stapf
Lasianthus micranthus Hook.f.
Lasianthus microcalyx K.Schum.
Lasianthus minutiflorus H.Zhu
Lasianthus mollis Ridl.
Lasianthus montanus King & Gamble
Lasianthus moonii Wight
Lasianthus mucronulatus (Korth.) Miq.
Lasianthus myrtifolius Ridl.
Lasianthus neolanceolatus Ridsdale
Lasianthus nervosus King & Gamble
Lasianthus nigrescens H.Zhu
Lasianthus oblanceolatus Naiki, Tagane & Yahara
Lasianthus obliquinervis Merr.
Lasianthus obliquus (Thwaites) Thwaites
Lasianthus oblongatus Merr.
Lasianthus oblongifolius Bedd.
Lasianthus oblongilobus H.Zhu
Lasianthus oblongus King & Gamble
Lasianthus obovatibracteatus H.Zhu
Lasianthus obovatus Bedd.
Lasianthus obscurus (DC.) Blume ex Miq.
Lasianthus oliganthus Thwaites
Lasianthus oligoneurus K.Schum.
Lasianthus ovatus (Korth.) Miq.
Lasianthus palawanensis H.Zhu
Lasianthus panamensis (Dwyer) Robbr.
Lasianthus papuanus Wernham
Lasianthus parviflorus H.Zhu
Lasianthus parvifolius Wight
Lasianthus pauciflorus Wight
Lasianthus pedicellatus H.Zhu
Lasianthus pedunculatus E.A.Bruce
Lasianthus pendulus Ridl.
Lasianthus perakensis King & Gamble
Lasianthus pergamaceus King & Gamble
Lasianthus phymatodeus H.Zhu
Lasianthus pierrei Pit.
Lasianthus pilosus Wight
Lasianthus platyphyllus (Korth.) Miq.
Lasianthus politus Ridl.
Lasianthus protractus (Thwaites) Thwaites
Lasianthus pseudolongifolius H.Zhu
Lasianthus pseudostipularis Amshoff ex Bakh.f.
Lasianthus puberulus Craib
Lasianthus puffii Napiroon, Balslev & Poopath
Lasianthus purpureocalyx Napiroon, Chamch., Balslev & Chayam.
Lasianthus purpureus Blume
Lasianthus rabilii Craib
Lasianthus repens Hepper
Lasianthus repoeuensis Pierre ex Pit.
Lasianthus reticulatus Blume
Lasianthus rhinocerotis Blume
Lasianthus rhizophyllus Thwaites
Lasianthus ridleyi King & Gamble
Lasianthus ridsdalei H.Zhu
Lasianthus rigidus Miq.
Lasianthus robinsonii Ridl.
Lasianthus roosianus H.Zhu
Lasianthus rostratus Wight
Lasianthus rotundatus Stapf
Lasianthus rufus (Korth.) Miq.
Lasianthus sabahensis H.Zhu
Lasianthus sapaensis V.S.Dang & Naiki
Lasianthus saprosmoides Pit.
Lasianthus sarmentosus Craib
Lasianthus saxorum Craib
Lasianthus scabridus King & Gamble
Lasianthus scalariformis King & Gamble
Lasianthus schmidtii K.Schum.
Lasianthus sessilis Talbot
Lasianthus setulosus H.Zhu
Lasianthus sikkimensis Hook.f.
Lasianthus simizui (Tang S.Liu & J.M.Chao) H.Zhu
Lasianthus sithammaratensis Napiroon, Balslev & Chayam.
Lasianthus sogerensis Wernham
Lasianthus solomonensis H.Zhu
Lasianthus stephanocalycinus Naiki, Tagane & Yahara
Lasianthus stercorarius Blume
Lasianthus sterrophyllus Merr.
Lasianthus stipularis Blume
Lasianthus strigillosus Hook.f.
Lasianthus strigosus Wight
Lasianthus subaureus Craib
Lasianthus subcalvus Craib
Lasianthus subglobosus H.Zhu
Lasianthus submembranifolius Elmer
Lasianthus sumatraensis H.Zhu
Lasianthus sylvestroides Valeton
Lasianthus tamdaoensis V.S.Dang
Lasianthus tennissarimensis Napiroon, Balslev & Chayam.
Lasianthus tenuifolius H.Zhu
Lasianthus tetragonus H.Zhu
Lasianthus thuyanae V.S.Dang & Naiki
Lasianthus thwaitesii Hook.f.
Lasianthus tomentosus Blume
Lasianthus trichophlebus Hemsl.
Lasianthus undulatus H.Zhu
Lasianthus urophylloides R.D.Good
Lasianthus varians (Thwaites) Thwaites
Lasianthus venosus Blume
Lasianthus venulosus (Wight & Arn.) Wight
Lasianthus verrucosus H.S.Lo
Lasianthus verticillatus (Lour.) Merr.
Lasianthus viridiramulis Tagane
Lasianthus vrieseanus Miq.
Lasianthus vulcanicus Ridl.
Lasianthus walkerianus Wight
Lasianthus wallacei E.A.Bruce
Lasianthus wardii C.E.C.Fisch. & Kaul
Lasianthus wawoniensis Rugayah & Sunarti
Lasianthus wightianus Hook.f.
Lasianthus yaharae V.S.Dang, Tagane & H.Tran
Lasianthus yalaensis Napiroon, Duangjai & Poopath

Description 
Subshrubs, shrubs, or rarely, small trees. - Leaves opposite, distichous. Stipules interpetiolar, usually persistent. - Inflorescences axillary, usually sessile. Flowers small, white. - Calyx with 3 to 6 teeth or lobes; persistent. Corolla with 4 to 6 lobes; throat usually villous. - Stamens 4 to 6, inserted on corolla throat. Anthers dorsifixed. - Stigma with lanceolate or linear lobes. Ovary multilocular. - Ovules basal, erect, 1 per locule. - Fruit a small drupe, usually blue. Pyrenes with thick walls.

History 
The generic name Lasianthus is derived from the Greek lasios, "shaggy, velvety, hairy", and anthos, "flower". The genus was named by William Jack in 1823.

Some authors have recognized Dressleriopsis and Litosanthes as genera separate from Lasianthus. Dressleriopsis was sunk into Lasianthus in 1982.

Litosanthes was erected by Carl Ludwig Blume in 1823. It was synonymized under Lasianthus in 1992. DNA sequence analysis has not resolved the question of whether Litosanthes is nested within Lasianthus or separate from it.

Affinities 
Lasianthus, Saldinia, and Trichostachys form the tribe Lasiantheae in the subfamily Rubioideae. Perama is related to this group and might be included within it. Lasiantheae was formerly thought to be close to Psychotria, but is now known to be a basal clade in Rubioideae. It is sister to the large clade containing Coussarea, Psychotria, Spermacoce, and many other genera.

Saprosma and Amaracarpus were traditionally thought to be close to Lasianthus. Saprosma is polyphyletic, with only part of it related to Lasianthus. Amaracarpus is close to Psychotria. The African genera Batopedina and Dirichletia have also been suggested as relatives of Lasianthus.

Taxonomy 
Only one molecular phylogenetic study has sampled more than a few species from the tribe Lasiantheae. In that study, 11 species of Lasianthus were sampled, but few relationships were resolved.

In 2012, a revision of the Malesian species divided Lasianthus into 3 sections, based on the following type species: L. section Stipulares (Lasianthus stipularis), L. section Lasianthus (Lasianthus cyanocarpus), and L. section Nudiflorae (Lasianthus blumeanus). They did not recognize L. section Pedunculatae (Lasianthus biermanii), which some previous authors had recognized. They considered it to be indistinguishable from L. section Lasianthus.

References

External links 
 Lasianthus  Search Page  World Checklist of Rubiaceae  Index by Team  Projects  Science Directory  Scientific Research and Data  Kew Gardens
 Lasianthus  Names  Tropicos  Science and Conservation  Missouri Botanical Garden
 Lasianthus  List of Genera  Rubiaceae  List of families  Families and Genera in GRIN  Queries  GRIN taxonomy for plants
 Lasianthus  Lasiantheae  Rubioideae  Rubiaceae  Embryophyta  Streptophytina  Streptophyta  Viridiplantae  Eukaryota  Taxonomy  UniProt
 Lasianthus  Index Nominum Genericorum   References   NMNH Department of Botany   Research and Collections   Smithsonian National Museum of Natural History
 Revision of Malesian Lasianthus
 List of lower taxa  Lasianthus.pdf  Lasianthus  List of lower taxa (genera)  Chinese Plant Names  Rubiaceae  FOC vol. 19  page 2  Family List  Flora of China  eFloras
 Flora of Sri Lanka
 Flora of Tropical East Africa At: page 3 Of: Projects At: Science Directory At: Scientific Research and Data At: Science and Conservation At: Home At: About Kew At: Kew Gardens
 The Convoluted History of Lisianthus, etc.  Eustoma  Chironieae  Classification overview  Gentian Research Network
 CRC World Dictionary of Plant Names: D-L  Botany & Plant Science  Life Science  CRC Press
 Lasianthus  Plant Names  IPNI
 Lasianthus, page 125  Volume 14  Bibliography  Transactions of the Linnean Society of London  Titles beginning with "T"  Titles  Biodiversity Heritage Library
 Xiao & Zhu 2007 on Lasianthus  Volume 48(2)  Issue Indices  Botanical Studies an international journal

 
Rubiaceae genera
Taxonomy articles created by Polbot